Fellows Morton & Clayton Ltd was, for much of the early 20th century, the largest and best-known canal transportation company in England. The company was in existence from 1889 to 1947.

Origins

The company started in 1837 when James Fellows, an agent for a canal carrier, decided to start his own company. James was 32 and based in West Bromwich. His first boat was called "Providence". In January 1839 he was allowed toll credit on the Warwick and Napton Canal as his boats were working down to London so frequently. He expanded rapidly and moved his operation to Toll End in Tipton in 1841. His business was as a "Railway & Canal Carrier" even though his rail activities were minor. James died in 1854 aged 49, and his widow Eliza carried on the business until their son Joshua was old enough to be an official partner. By 1855 he was transporting 13,000 tons of iron castings between London and Birmingham each year.

In the late 1850s a new boat-building facility was built at Tipton and by the early 1860s the fleet had grown to some 50 boats. Long-distance carrying was the mainstay of the business during these early years.

In 1876 Frederick Morton brought with him investment capital to expand the business, and the company name was changed to Fellows Morton & Co. This new company continued to absorb smaller traders, so expanding with new boats and also with acquired vessels.

Formation of the company

In 1888–1889 William Clayton of Saltley, who operated a special fleet of liquid cargo boats as well as traditional loads, became the third partner. William died before the companies merged formally but his son, Thomas, took his place. Fellows, Morton & Clayton Ltd. was formed on 3 July 1889.

The three managing directors appointed at the first meeting of the new company were Joshua Fellows, Frederick Morton and Thomas Clayton, on salaries of £600, each. The new chairman of Fellows, Morton & Clayton Ltd. was Alderman Reuben Farley the majority of shareholders being family members of the directors of the company.

At the time of formation the general cargo fleet amounted to some 11 steamers and around 112 butty boats. The tank boats were transferred to another new company which was called Thomas Clayton Limited of Oldbury.

The company's first results for the 18 months ending 30 June 1890 showed a net profit of £7,497. Trading had not been easy to start with – a dock strike in London had caused a serious financial loss and an epidemic of Russian influenza amongst the horses had caused many deaths. However, as there was new traffic, a new basin and headquarters were completed at Fazeley Street in Birmingham. The headquarters were designed by the builder Edwin Shipway. The company had also acquired the interests of a rival carrier, Fanshaw and Pinson. The capital then stood at £84,620; barges, boats and steamers were valued at £20,852, and horses at £4,000.

Last known working boats in existence

Currently there are only 29 of these boats still in existence, 6 of which are still in use to this day. The last remaining boats of this type are in the National Waterways Museum. There are 12 recorded sink-ages, and there are two currently in restoration. The conditions of the rest are currently unknown. Any information to improving this section is welcome.

Steam-powered boats

In the new boatyard at Fazeley Street they built five steel-plate steam-powered boats. After an initial period of use they were found unsatisfactory because of the excessive wear on the hull's steel.

In 1896 Fellows Morton & Clayton tried iron in the construction of their boats. The boat had an elm bottom and iron sides. This proved much more effective and 3 of the 5 original steel steamers were rebuilt.

Between 1898 and 1899, 8 more iron composite steamers were produced from the Saltley dock and 9 more between 1905 and 1911.

The steamers were known as fly-boats or express-boats and kept mainly on main-line long-distance routes. On the timetable, a trip from London (City Road Basin) to Birmingham (Fazeley Street Depot) would take around 54 hours. It was a non-stop service and the crew of four would change shifts along the route. The main drawback was the lack of carrying space on the boat due to the size of the engine and boiler. The boats picked up coke at preset points along their routes.

President survives and is owned and operated by and from the Black Country Living Museum.

List of steamers built by Fellows Morton & Clayton

Motor boats

In 1906 an experiment was carried out on the steamer Vulcan: a gas suction engine was fitted, which reduced the size of crew needed to run the boat and also reduced the fuel consumption, but the size of the installation was still an issue. In 1911 a rival carrier had tried a semi-diesel engine which had proved to be successful. Fellows Morton & Clayton built a boat for testing this engine (a Swedish Bolinder single-cylinder direct-reversing engine from J. & C. G. Bolinder of Stockholm) which was built with a similar hull to the steamers but with a shortened engine room. Linda became the first motor boat of the fleet. The new engine was a success and they immediately started building another nine. Due to the success of the new engine they converted all steamers to motor boats by 1927.

Fellows Morton & Clayton had built mainly their own boats, the Uxbridge dock building wooden boats and Saltley building new and maintaining existing boats. In 1922 they approached W. J. Yarwood & Sons of Northwich to make 12 motor boats. The first arrived in May 1923. They ordered 12 more from Yarwoods which were delivered hull-only starting in 1926.

Depots

The headquarters of the company was at Fazeley Street in Birmingham. In addition to this, the company maintained depots at the following locations.

London, Regent's Canal Dock
Brentford
Bulls Bridge
Reading
Slough
Hertford
Uxbridge
Berkhamsted
Aylesbury
Oxford
Blisworth
Northampton
Peterborough
Long Buckby
Braunston
Stratford on Avon
Warwick
Coventry
Worcester
Stourport
Dudley Port
Wolverhampton
Great Haywood
Burton on Trent
Derby
Langley Mill
Nottingham
Newark on Trent
Leicester
Foxton
Market Harborough

Liveries

The first Fellows Morton & Clayton livery was a combination of black & white with a red dividing line. Shortly after the company re-incorporated in 1921 the livery changed to red, green and yellow.

Ending

In the first 6 months of 1948 Fellows Morton & Clayton incurred its first trading loss of £5,000, and in November 1948 the company went into voluntary liquidation. The assets were taken over by the British Transport Commission on 1 January 1949.

See also

W. H. Walker and Brothers

References

Canals in England
Transport companies established in 1889
Transport companies disestablished in 1948
Defunct shipbuilding companies of the United Kingdom
Defunct companies based in Birmingham, West Midlands
1889 establishments in England
British companies established in 1889
1948 disestablishments in England
British companies disestablished in 1948